Lukas Pöstlberger (born 10 January 1992) is an Austrian cyclist, who currently rides for UCI WorldTeam . He won the Austrian National Road Race Championships in 2012.

Born in Vöcklabruck, Pöstlberger was named in the start list for the 2017 Giro d'Italia and won the opening stage, becoming the first Austrian rider to win a stage of the Giro and the first Austrian to lead the race. In July 2018, he was named in the start list for the 2018 Tour de France.

Major results

2011
 1st Stage 1 (TTT) Sibiu Cycling Tour
 5th Time trial, National Road Championships
2012
 National Road Championships
1st  Road race
4th Time trial
 1st Stage 3 Tour de l'Avenir
2013
 1st GP Kranj
 5th Road race, National Road Championships
 5th Overall Tour of Al Zubarah
 6th Overall Sibiu Cycling Tour
1st  Young rider classification
 9th Road race, UEC European Under-23 Road Championships
 9th Gran Premio San Giuseppe
2014
 1st Tour Bohemia
2015
 1st  Overall An Post Rás
 1st Stage 7 Tour of Austria
 1st  Mountains classification, Oberösterreich Rundfahrt
 2nd Belgrade Banjaluka II
 3rd Trofeo Edil C
 4th Time trial, National Road Championships
 10th Overall Istrian Spring Trophy
1st Prologue
2016
 1st Stage 4 Oberösterreich Rundfahrt
 10th Druivenkoers Overijse
2017
 Giro d'Italia
1st Stage 1
Held  &  after Stage 1
Held  after Stages 1–2
 National Road Championships
2nd Road race
3rd Time trial
 5th E3 Harelbeke
2018
 National Road Championships
1st  Road race
4th Time trial
2019
 4th Dwars door Vlaanderen
 8th Overall Okolo Slovenska
2021
 1st Stage 2 Critérium du Dauphiné
2022
 3rd Road race, National Road Championships
2023
 10th Clàssica Comunitat Valenciana 1969

Grand Tour general classification results timeline

References

External links

 Lukas Pöstlberger at Bora–Hansgrohe
 
 
 
 
 

1992 births
Living people
Austrian male cyclists
Austrian Giro d'Italia stage winners
Rás Tailteann winners
Sportspeople from Upper Austria
People from Vöcklabruck